Google Search, offered by Google, is the most widely used search engine on the World Wide Web as of 2014, with over four billion searches a day. This page covers key events in the history of Google's search service.

For a history of Google the company, including all of Google's products, acquisitions, and corporate changes, see the history of Google page.

Big picture

Full timeline

See also
 Timeline of web search engines

References

Google Search
Google Search
Google Search
History of Google